Thibaud Flament (born 29 April 1997) is a French rugby union player, who plays as a lock or flanker for French Top 14 club Toulouse and the France national team.

Early life
Born in Paris, Thibaud Flament grew up in Brussels, Belgium where his father worked and founded an amateur rugby union club. He started rugby at the age of 8, playing for ASUB Waterloo, one of the best clubs in Belgium. He left Belgium for the United Kingdom and Loughborough University to pursue his college studies, at the age of 18.

Club career
Flament began playing rugby for Loughborough Students RUFC, the famous British college team. Playing usually as a fly-half, he started in the fifth team and then changed of position, being converted to the second row due to his height and his weight gain. In 2017, he spent one placement year in Argentina playing for Club Newman before returning to Loughborough, now  a first-teamer and an important player.

Consequently, he drew the attention of Wasps and joined the Premiership team academy in June 2019. On 21 September 2019, he made his professional debut against Saracens in the 2019–20 Premiership Rugby Cup and scored a try. 

After playing sixteen games with the Coventry club, Flament signed for Toulouse on 17 August 2020. In his first year with the French club, he won the 2020-21 Top 14 and the 2020–21 European Rugby Champions Cup and then extended his contract until 2026 on 8 June 2022.

International career
He was first called to the French national senior team by Fabien Galthié on 18 October 2021, for the autumn internationals. He earned his first cap for France on 6 November 2021 against Argentina, scoring a try on his debut. In 2022, he won the 2022 Six Nations Championship and the Grand Slam, clinching the title with a 25–13 win over England at the Stade de France.

International tries

Honours

Toulouse
 European Rugby Champions Cup: 2020–21
 Top 14: 2020-21

France
 Six Nations Championship: 2022

References

External links
France profile at FFR

1997 births
Living people
French rugby union players
Club Newman rugby union players
Loughborough Students RUFC players
Wasps RFC players
Stade Toulousain players
Rugby union players from Paris
Rugby union locks
Expatriate rugby union players in Argentina
French expatriate sportspeople in Argentina
French expatriate rugby union players
Expatriate rugby union players in England
French expatriate sportspeople in England
Sportspeople from Brussels
Belgian rugby union players
Alumni of Loughborough University